Tom Bohman is an American mathematician who is a former head of the Department of Mathematical Sciences and is a Alexander M. Knaster Professor at Carnegie Mellon University.

References

Year of birth missing (living people)
Living people
Carnegie Mellon University faculty
American mathematicians
Rutgers University alumni